Swan Plain is a hamlet in the Canadian province of Saskatchewan.

Demographics 

References

Clayton No. 333, Saskatchewan
Designated places in Saskatchewan
Organized hamlets in Saskatchewan
Division No. 9, Saskatchewan